The 2011–12 FK-League was the third season of the FK-League. The season began on 9 December 2011, and ended on 24 March 2012. All matches were played at Boeun Gymnasium, Boeun.

Teams
 Gyeongju Soonwoo FC – New team
 Gyeongsan Osung FC – New team
 Jeonju MAG FC
 FS Seoul
 Seoul Gwangjin FC
 Yes Gumi FC
 Yongin FS

League table

Champions

Awards
 Most Valuable Player : Shin Jong-Hoon (FS Seoul)
 Best Goalscorer : Song Jung-Sub (FS Seoul, 25 goals) 
 Best Goalkeeper : Heo Myung-Beom (FS Seoul) 
 Best Manager : Lee Chang-Hwan (FS Seoul) 
 Fair Play Team : Gyeongju Soonwoo FC

References

FK-League
2011 in futsal
2012 in futsal